Biddle House, also known as the Vandergrift-Biddle House, is a historic home located near Port Penn and St. Georges, New Castle County, Delaware.  The house underwent five distinct periods of growth and in the process has grown from a one-room-plan plank house to an extended rambling two-story structure. The earliest section was built about 1780, with the first modification made in the early-19th century. It was later expanded during the Victorian era with wings.

It was listed on the National Register of Historic Places in 1978.

References

External links

Historic American Buildings Survey in Delaware
Houses on the National Register of Historic Places in Delaware
Houses completed in 1780
Houses in New Castle County, Delaware
National Register of Historic Places in New Castle County, Delaware